H. C. Stülcken Sohn (also known as Stülcken-Werft) was a German shipbuilding company located in Hamburg and founded in 1846 by Heinrich Christoph Stülcken.

During World War I the company built one single U-boat for the Kaiserliche Marine, the U-157, which under command of the famous Max Valentiner undertook the longest cruise in the war from November 27, 1917 to April 15, 1918, a total of 139 days. During World War II the company built 24 VIIC U-boats for the Kriegsmarine. The company used slave labour of the Neuengamme concentration camp with its own subcamp.

After the war the company constructed several vessels for the Bundesmarine. In the 1950s the company developed the so-called Stülcken derrick, a lifting device for very heavy cargo.

In 1966 the company was absorbed by Blohm + Voss.

Ships built by H. C. Stülcken Sohn (selection)

Civilian ships
 No. 5 Elbe (1883)

Navy training ship
 Barquentine Dewaruci, Indonesian Navy (1932–1952)
 Barquentine Jadran, Montenegrin Navy (1930–1931)

Naval ships

Frigates
 6 × Köln class frigates (1958–1962)

Destroyers
 4 × Hamburg class destroyers (1959–1963)

Auxiliary
 Deutschland (A59) (1959)

Submarines (U-boats)
 SM U-157 (1916)
 24 × Type VIIC submarines (1939–1944)

References

External links
 uboat.net: Summary of World War I U-boats built by H. C. Stülcken Sohn 
 uboat.net: Summary of World War II U-boats built by H. C. Stülcken Sohn

Manufacturing companies based in Hamburg
Defunct companies of Germany
Neuengamme concentration camp
Shipbuilding companies of Germany
German companies established in 1846